is a Japanese entertainer who is a former member of the idol group SDN48 and represented by the talent agency, A-Plus.

Biography
In 2008, Serina was nominated for high school girls uniform competition run by Weekly Young Jump.

On August 1, 2009, she became a member of SDN48. Up until October 15, Serina had been fabricating her age by three years. Her reason for doing that was that "My school banned working in the entertainment industry, so I did it so as not be found out."

On March 31, 2012, all members of SDN48 graduated and their last performance was SDN48 Concert "Next Encore" in NHK Hall in NHK Hall.

Filmography

Dramas

Educational series

TV series

Films

Stage

Advertisements

Others

References

External links
 Official profile 
  

Japanese television personalities
Japanese idols
1985 births
Living people
Actors from Hokkaido
21st-century Japanese actresses
People from Iwamizawa, Hokkaido